Charles Webster Hawthorne (January 8, 1872 – November 29, 1930) was an American portrait and genre painter and a noted teacher who founded the Cape Cod School of Art in 1899.

He was born in Lodi, Illinois, and his parents returned to Maine, raising him in the state where Charles' father was born. At age 18, he went to New York, working as an office-boy by day in a stained-glass factory and studying at night school and with Henry Siddons Mowbray and William Merritt Chase, and abroad in both the Netherlands and Italy. In 1908 he was elected into the National Academy of Design as an Associate member and became a full Academician in 1911.

 [He studied painting under several notable artists] at the National Academy of Design and the Art Students League. Among his teachers were Frank Vincent DuMond and George de Forest Brush. But Hawthorne declared that the most dominant influence in his career was William Merritt Chase, with whom he worked as both a pupil and assistant. Both men were naturally talented teachers and figurative painters who were drawn to rich color and the lusciousness of oil paint as a medium. Chase passed on a Munich tradition of tone values and tone painting, and Hawthorne learned all he could.

While studying abroad in the Netherlands as Chase's assistant, Hawthorne was influenced to start his own school of art.

His winters were spent in Paris and New York City, his summers at Provincetown, Massachusetts, the site of his school. In addition to founding the Cape Cod School of Art, Hawthorne was also a founding member of the Provincetown Art Association established in 1914. While in Paris Hawthorne became a full member of the French Société Nationale des Beaux-Arts in 1917.

The Cape Cod School of Art was the first outdoor summer school for figure painting and grew into one of the nation's leading art schools. Under thirty years of Hawthorne's guidance, the school attracted some of the most talented art instructors and students in the country including John Noble, Richard Miller, and Max Bohm. At his school, Hawthorne gave weekly criticisms and instructive talks, guiding his pupils and setting up ideals but never imposing his own technique or method.
Another well known student was Norman Rockwell, who studied with Hawthorne one summer while he was enrolled at the Art Students League.  William H. Johnson also studied with Hawthorne and later got a grant from him. Another pupil was Bertha Noyes, long an important figure in the artistic scene of Washington, D.C.

Among his works:  

 The Trousseau, Metropolitan Museum of Art
 Mother and Child, Syracuse Museum
 Net Mender, Rhode Island School of Design, Providence
 Venetian Girl, Worcester Art Museum
 The Family, Buffalo Fine Arts Academy
  Crew of the Philomena Manta, 1915, Provincetown Art Collection
 Fish Cleaners, Provincetown Art Collection
 Untitled (Study of girl in white), 1927, Provincetown Art Collection
 Girl in Yellow Scarf, 1904, Butler Institute of American Art, Youngstown, Ohio
 The Fisherman's Daughter, Corcoran Gallery of Art, Washington, D.C.
 The Fish and the Man, 1925 (larger image), Dallas Museum of Art, Dallas, Texas

His class studio in Provincetown on Miller Hill Road (currently known as the Hawthorne School of Art) was added August 21, 1978, to the National Register of Historic Places. His wife was the painter Marion Campbell Hawthorne; their son, Joseph Hawthorne, was a successful orchestral conductor.

References

Further reading 
 The book Hawthorne On Painting was compiled from students' notes and collected by Mrs. Charles W. Hawthorne, copyright 1938 by J. C. Hawthorne with copyright renewed in 1965 by J. C. Hawthorne. The first publisher was Pitman Publishing Corporation. There was also an enlarged republication by Dover Publications, Inc. in 1960, .

External links 

 "A Painter's Painter: Charles Webster Hawthorne; The Influence of Provincetown and Henry Hensche on Sammy Britt, Gerald DeLoach, Richard Kelso, and George T. Thurmond"
Several Hawthorne exhibition catalogs from The Metropolitan Museum of Art Libraries (fully available online as PDF)
 "Finding Aid for the Charles W. Hawthorne Papers, 1904-1947", The Frick Collection/Frick Art Reference Library Archives.

1872 births
1930 deaths
19th-century American painters
American male painters
20th-century American painters
American genre painters
People from Provincetown, Massachusetts
Painters from Maine
Students of William Merritt Chase
Painters from Massachusetts
People from Clark County, Illinois
Painters from Illinois
National Academy of Design members
19th-century American male artists
20th-century American male artists
Members of the American Academy of Arts and Letters